The African Cup of Champions Clubs 1970 was the 6th edition of the annual international club football competition held in the CAF region (Africa), the African Cup of Champions Clubs. It determined that year's club champion of association football in Africa.

The tournament was played by 23 teams and used a knock-out format with ties played home and away. Asante Kotoko from Ghana won the final, and became CAF club champion for the first time.

First round

|}
1 CARA Brazzaville won after drawing of lots. 
2 CR Belcourt withdrew after the first leg.

Second round

|}
1 Prisons FC Kampala and Modèle Lomé won after drawing of lots. 
2 The match was abandoned with Asante Kotoko leading 1–0 after a pitch invasion; Asante Kotoko qualified.

Quarter-finals

|}

Semi-finals

|}

Final

Champion

Top scorers
The top scorers from the 1970 African Cup of Champions Clubs are as follows:

External links
African Cup of Champions results at Rec.Sport.Soccer Statistics Foundation

1970 in African football
African Cup of Champions Clubs